Karl Trasti (19 February 1917 - 4 October 1976) was a Norwegian civil servant and politician for the Labour Party.

During the third cabinet Gerhardsen he was appointed state secretary to the Minister of Finance in 1955, a post he held one year. He was later appointed Minister of Pay and Prices in 1962, and held that post to 1964 except for the month-long tenure of the cabinet Lyng in 1963. He then changed to Minister of Industry, but lost his job when the cabinet fell in 1965.

Born in Vadsø and graduating as cand.jur. in 1942, he notably worked as a judge during the legal purge after World War II. He was a secretary and consultant in the Ministry of Finance from 1943 to 1953, and director of the Norwegian Customs Authorities (named the Norwegian Customs and Excise Authorities from 1974) from 1957 to 1976, the year he died.

Trasti never held elected political office.

References

1917 births
1976 deaths
Norwegian state secretaries
Government ministers of Norway
Labour Party (Norway) politicians
Norwegian civil servants
Norwegian jurists
Personnel of the legal purge in Norway
Members of the Storting
20th-century Norwegian lawyers
People from Vadsø
Ministers of Trade and Shipping of Norway